JC Lobo, known professionally as Ritualz, and recognised by the logo †‡†, is a musician based in Mexico City. His work as Ritualz is, essentially, a dark electronic music project associated with the witch house music genre and has since incorporated a darkwave and industrial-inspired sound. Ritualz's latest album, Häxan was released in 2020. Ritualz began producing music in the late 2000s, and takes direct inspiration from Marilyn Manson in creating his ephemeral and dark soundscapes. Currently he manages an independent record label called "Maligna".

Discography

Albums
 "Häxan" (2020, Maligna) 

 "Doom" (2018, Artoffact Records)

Anthology
 Outworld Music (2014, Maligna)

EPs
 Untitled CD-R (2010, Disaro)
 Ghetto Ass Witch (2011, self-released)
 †‡† vs. Fostercare (2011, Robot Elephant Records)
 Hypermotion X (2012)
 "Rare Trax (2016)
 "Rare Trax II (2017)

References

Mexican electronic musicians
People from Mexico City